Loukov is name of several locations in the Czech Republic: 
Loukov (Mladá Boleslav District) 
Loukov (Kroměříž District)